Dirk Wippermann (born 27 January 1946) is a German former discus thrower who competed in the 1972 Summer Olympics.

References

1946 births
Living people
West German male discus throwers
Olympic athletes of West Germany
Athletes (track and field) at the 1972 Summer Olympics